The German composer Richard Strauss (1864–1949) was prolific and long-lived, writing 16 operas from 1892 up until his death in 1949. Strauss "emerged soon after the deaths of Wagner and Brahms as the most important living German composer", and was crucial in inaugurating the musical style of Modernism. His operas were dominant representatives of the genre in his time, particularly his earlier ones: Salome (1905), Elektra (1909), Der Rosenkavalier (1911) and Ariadne auf Naxos (1912). His earliest work, Der Kampf mit dem Drachen ( 1876), was a juvenile sketch, and is sometimes not counted as part of his operatic oeuvre; his final opera,  ( 1947–1949), was unfinished at his death and completed by Karl Haussner in 1964.

List of operas

References

Notes

Citations

Sources

  
  
 
 

Lists of operas by composer
 
Lists of compositions by composer